Russell Prescott is a former Republican member of the Executive Council of New Hampshire, representing the 3rd district from 2017 to 2021. Prescott is also a former member of the New Hampshire Senate, representing the 23rd district from 2010 to 2016. He was a candidate in the Republican primary for New Hampshire's 1st congressional district in the 2022 elections.

References

|-

|-

Members of the Executive Council of New Hampshire
Republican Party New Hampshire state senators
21st-century American politicians
People from Kingston, New Hampshire
University of South Florida alumni
Candidates in the 2022 United States House of Representatives elections